The fifth competition weekend of the 2022–23 ISU Speed Skating World Cup was held at the Ice Arena in Tomaszów Mazowiecki, Poland, from Friday, 10 February, until Sunday, 12 February 2023.

Medal summary

Men's events

 In mass start, race points are accumulated during the race based on results of the intermediate sprints and the final sprint. The skater with most race points is the winner.

Women's events

 In mass start, race points are accumulated during the race based on results of the intermediate sprints and the final sprint. The skater with most race points is the winner.

Results

Men's events

500 m
The race started on 11 February at 15:41.

1000 m
The race started on 12 February at 16:52.

1500 m
The race started on 10 February at 17:00.

5000 m
The race started on 11 February at 16:20.

Mass start
The race started on 12 February at 17:54.

Team pursuit
The race started on 10 February at 19:15.

Women's events

500 m
The race started on 10 February at 17:40.

1000 m
The race started on 12 February at 16:17.

1500 m
The race started on 11 February at 15:00.

3000 m
The race started on 10 February at 18:19.

Mass start
The race started on 12 February at 17:35.

Team pursuit
The race started on 11 February at 17:34.

References

ISU World Cup, 2022–23, 5

5
ISU Speed Skating World Cup, 2022–23, World Cup 5
ISU
ISU